Nola pleurosema is a moth of the family Nolidae.

It is endemic to in Australia.

pleurosema
Moths of Australia
Endemic flora of Australia
Moths described in 1944